Children's Health Ireland at Temple Street is a children's hospital located on Temple Street, Dublin, Ireland. It is a teaching hospital of University College Dublin and Trinity College Dublin.

History

The hospital was founded by Mrs. Ellen Woodlock and her close friend Sarah Atkinson at 9 Upper Buckingham Street in 1872. It had just 8 beds when it opened. In 1876, the growing success of the hospital prompted the governing committee to invite the Religious Sisters of Charity to take over the running of the hospital.

In May 1879 the lease at 9 Upper Buckingham Street expired and, with the help of a bequest, the sisters purchased the former home of the Earls of Bellomont at 15 Temple Street. Over the following years adjoining houses were purchased such as the residence of the Parnell family, number 14. The hospital expanded in the 1930s with help from the Irish Hospitals' Sweepstake.

A new nurses' home and a new x-ray department was officially opened by Minister of Lands, Seán Flanagan, in the presence of the President of Ireland, Éamon de Valera, in 1972.

In line with other teaching hospitals, the facility changed its name from the "Children's Hospital, Temple Street" to the "Children's University Hospital, Temple Street" in the late 1990s and changed its name again to the "Temple Street Children's University Hospital" in 2012.

In November 2012 the Minister for Health James Reilly announced plans to transfer the hospital's services to a new children's hospital on the campus of St. James's Hospital.

The hospital changed its name from Temple Street Children's University Hospital to Children's Health Ireland at Temple Street as part of the rebranding of three hospitals under the Children's Health Ireland banner on 1 January 2019.

References

Further reading

External links
Official website

Teaching hospitals in Dublin (city)
Children's hospitals in the Republic of Ireland
1872 establishments in Ireland
Hospitals established in 1872
Health Service Executive hospitals